Harpalus calceatus is a species of ground beetle in the subfamily Harpalinae. It was described by Duftschmid in 1811.

References

calceatus
Beetles described in 1812